Gaëlino M'Bani better known by his stage name Lino is a French rapper. He was a member of the French rap duo Ärsenik with his brother Calboni M'Bani known as Calbo in the duo. He has also his solo output independent of Ärsenik. Lino's family originates from Congo.

Career
Ärsenik started as a band in mid 1990s. Until 1997, the group also included Tony Truand, a cousin. In 1998, now a duo, Ärsenik released their first album Quelques gouttes suffisent went double gold. In 2007 the group released a disc titled S'il en reste quelque chose which included the most popular songs from the two brothers, such as "L'enfer remonte à la surface", "Rime & chatiments" and "Sexe, pouvoir & biftons".

In the late 1990s, Lino and his brother Calbo teamed up with a group of rappers who were also second-generation Africans, on a collaborative project called Bisso Na Bisso, an expression which means "just between ourselves" in Lingala, the most commonly spoken language in the Congo region. Part of this group were Ben-J (from Les Neg'Marrons), Passi (from Ministère A.M.E.R.),  twin brothers Doc and G Kill (from 2Bal), and Mystik and his female cousin M'Passi. The group embarked on a collective return to their African roots, featuring music with an innovative fusion of styles, that mixed modern hip-hop and zouk sounds with traditional Congolese rumba.

In 2004, Lino collaborated in a music project launched by Kery James in the single "Relève la tête" credited to "Kery James presents Lino, AP, Diam's, Passi, Matt & Kool Shen". In 2007, he also collaborated with three tracks on rapper Stomy Bugsy album Rimes Passionnelles and in 2009, took part in Bisso Na Bisso's project Africa.

Lino has released two solo albums of his own, Paradis assassiné released in September 2005 which was the title of a solo song on the group's second album. Lino also released Radio Bitume in May 2012. Both have charted in France.

In 2012 he signed with AZ, now part of Universal Music.

Discography

Albums
in duo Ärsenik
See discography of Ärsenik

Solo

Singles
in Ärsenik
See discography of Ärsenik

Singles

Featured in

References

French rappers
French people of Republic of the Congo descent
Living people
Year of birth missing (living people)